Kaštel Sućurac is a town within the administrative area of Kaštela in Dalmatia, Croatia. Kaštel Sućurac is first of its 7 kastels from East. Patron saint of the town is Saint George (Sv. Jure locally).

A noted element of the ancient history of this region is Diocletian's Palace in nearby Split, which structure was constructed in the period 293 to 305 .

History

In Kaštel Sućurac stands the oldest defensive fortress built in 1392 by A. Gvaldo the Archbishop of Split. to protect peasants from the settlement Putalj which was situated on the slopes of Kozjak, near the little church of St. Juraj. Additional building formed a settlement by the sea.

Archbishop Averaldo built his summer residence in 1488, and castle gets its final form in 1509. The oldest center of Sućurac is Kaštilac, a yard of fortified palace – villa with the south wall opened by lavishly decorated windows in High Gothic style. Unlike other villages the square is here formed on the south side of the summer residence. Today, there is the exhibition room "Podvorje" where one part of archeological artifacts from Putalj is held.

Only the bell tower remained of the parish church built in the 16th century after Allied bombing in 1943. Kaštel Sućurac was bombed on December 5 and 6, 1943 by the Allies. In the attack, a parish church from the 16th century was destroyed, resulting in the deaths of 67 locals, including the parish's priest. On December 13, another 38 were killed. In the communist Yugoslav era, the victims of the bombing were declared victims of fascism, which lasted until democratic changes in Croatia in 1990. In 2007 the town raised a monument to the victims.

See also
Diocletian's Palace
Jadro River
Solin
Castle Rotondo

References

External links
 Kaštel Sućurac informations

Populated places in Split-Dalmatia County